Igor Anatolyevich Orlov (Russian: Игорь Анатольевич Орлов; born 17 August 1964), is a Ukrainian-born Russian statesman and politician who served as the Governor of Arkhangelsk Oblast from 2012 to 2020. He is currently the General Director of PJSC Severnaya Verf Shipyard since June 2020.

Orlov was also a member of the Presidium of the Regional Political Council of the Arkhangelsk Region of the United Russia party.

Biography

Igor Orlov was born in Debaltseve, Ukraine, on 17 August 1964. He had studied at high school in that town. His father, Anatoliy, was in charge Debaltseve transport department of Party Committee, and then the transport department of Uglegorsk TPP.

In 1987, he graduated from the Leningrad Institute of Aviation Instrumentation (now Saint Petersburg), with a diploma in the specialty "electrical equipment of aircraft" and a diploma of qualification "electrical engineer".

At the same year, he was admitted to one of the largest military plants, specializing in ship repair and shipbuilding - the machine-building enterprise "Zvyozdochka" in the city of Severodvinsk. Initially, he worked as an electrician for the repair of electrical equipment.

From 1988 to 1991, he was a process engineer, and the head of the sector of the Onega design and technological bureau in the same Severodvinsk. In 1991, he became the head of the department as a chief technologist.

From 1994 to 2008, he worked at FSUE “Zvezdochka” ship repair center ”. At first he was the head of the department of the automated production control system (OASUP). In 1997 he was appointed Deputy General Director, Head of Department of Zvedochka. In 2003, he became the Deputy General Director, and Head of the Department for Economics, Development, Pricing and Finance. In 2004, he was promoted to the Deputy General Director for Economics and Foreign Economic Activity.

In 2008, Orlov moved to Kaliningrad, where he was appointed Deputy General Director, then temporary General Director, and a little later the General Director of JSC "Baltic Shipbuilding Plant" Yantar ". Worked at the enterprise until 30 June 2011.

On 10 August 2011, he was the First Deputy Executive Director for Production at the Avtotor Holding LLC car assembly plant in Kaliningrad. He was also the chairman of the Kaliningrad branch of the public organization "Union of Mechanical Engineers of Russia".

Governor of Arkhangelsk Oblast

On 13 January 2012, Russian President Dmitry Medvedev accepted the resignation from the post of Governor of the Arkhangelsk Oblast, Ilya Mikhalchuk, and appointed Igor Orlov as the Acting Governor. The Delovoy Peterburg edition noted that Orlov's appointment was unexpected.

Soon, on 31 January, President Medvedev proposed to the Arkhangelsk Regional Assembly of Deputies to give Igor Orlov the powers of governor. On 3 February, the deputies approved Orlov as the governor of the Arkhangelsk Oblast for 5 years.

Orlov's term expired in February 2017, but in May 2015 Orlov resigned ahead of schedule and at the same time asked President Vladimir Putin for permission to run again (in other cases the law prohibits this). Putin gave permission and appointed Orlov Acting Governor before taking office as elected in the elections. On 13 September 2015, the elections for the governor of the Arkhangelsk Oblast took place, in which Orlov won the first round with a result of 53.25% of the votes. The inauguration took place on 24 September 2015.

From 25 October 2014 to 7 April 2015, Orlov was the Member of the Presidium of the State Council of Russia.

In November 2015, he supported the introduction of the Platon system, and called the truckers' protests against the introduction of the system “brainless”.

On 8 July 2019, RBC published the news that Orlov may be dismissed as part of the next staff rotation. Сам Орлов эту информацию опроверг. Orlov himself denied this information.

On 12 November 2019, during a party conference of the regional branch of the United Russia party, Igor Orlov announced his readiness to take part in the elections for the governor of the Arkhangelsk region in 2020, despite rather shaky positions in various polls and ratings. Moreover, Orlov said that he expects to win the gubernatorial elections in the first round. The leader of the Arkhangelsk regional branch of the Communist Party, Aleksander Novikov, Orlov's intention, in Novikov's belief, to run with such a negative rating is a "desperate decision.".

Orlov resigned as Governor on 2 April 2020. He was replaced by Alexander Tsybulsky, who was previously Nenets Autonomous Okrug, as Tsybulsky was appointed. According to Orlov, he made the decision to resign based on the results of "large sociological research conducted by a number of professional companies.".

Criticism

In 2018, Igor Orlov supported the construction of Ecotechnopark, essentially an illegal landfill at Shies station. It is planned to allocate up to 10 billion rubles from the Moscow budget for the project. The media and a number of social activists claim that by his actions Orlov created a dangerous situation in the Arkhangelsk Oblast and the neighboring Komi Republic.

On 5 April 2019, at a meeting with the trade union leaders of Severodvinsk, he called his critics "all sorts of huskies" and said that he was "not a fool to give up billions." This prompted a backlash of criticism and demands to resign.

On April 7, 2019, thousands of unauthorized demonstrations took place in Arkhangelsk against the landfill in Shies, for the adoption of a law banning the import of garbage from other regions and for the resignation of Igor Orlov. The protesters occupied Troitsky Ave. from the Marine River Station to pl. Lenin. Interior Ministry officials tried to obstruct the march by standing in several lines across the march, the lines were demolished by the demonstrators. There is an opinion about deliberate sabotage of the order to obstruct the demonstrators: the employees of the Ministry of Internal Affairs behaved non-aggressively, smiled and even expressed solidarity with the demonstrators when they passed the cordon. After regrouping on pl. Lenin, the National Guard and the Ministry of Internal Affairs refused to use violence against the demonstrators. From the rostrum of the protest, the organizers of the march announced an indefinite protest action by EcoFinality, setting up tents in the center of the square. One of the symbols of the protest was a banner with the words “You will answer for the husk”.

On June 7, 2019, a lynched scarecrow with the inscription “I sold the North”, similar to Orlov, appeared on the wires near the City Administration over Voskresensky Avenue. To remove the scarecrow, the road part of the avenue was blocked and employees of the Ministry of Emergency Situations were involved. On June 20, 2019, after a direct line with Vladimir Putin, the activists appointed a public gathering at the square. Lenin to express his opinion on Putin's answer to the question of the illegal construction of the landfill in Shies. At the national gathering, EcoBendingless participants bring a wooden toilet, referring to Igor Orlov's frequent phrases about unwillingness to “hang in the toilet” because of the low rating.

At least 30 activists arrived at EcoBeach from 7:00 to 22:00 every day. Later, the time spent by the protesters in the square was gradually reduced. After Orlov's resignation, Eco-Perpetual on Lenin Square actually ceased from 7 April 2020. Reflective vests and the flag of Urdoma MO have become the symbol of EcoUnlimited. In the short April LED days, vests became especially popular. Some bloggers have compared EcoUnlimited to Yellow Vests in France, but activists refute the argument, since the protest was initially local in nature and not associated with foreign representations of opposition movements. The movement came out on categorically patriotic positions to the edge.

Shortly before the direct line, at the celebration of the Day of Russia, the demonstrators attended a rally-concert where Orlov spoke with congratulations, during which Orlov's speech was booed by people in vests. It was not accompanied by violence from the demonstrators. Orlov approached the demonstrators for a photo. Protest communities called such a photo useful, because since the beginning of the construction of Shies, the regional media tried to portray the Shies activists, nicknamed “defenders of the North,” as extremists and marginalized, but the photo with the governor showed that judgments about the aggressiveness of the activists are wrong. Orlov on a page in social networks commented on the photo as his inclination to dialogue with the demonstrators.

Further activities

In June 2020, Orlov was the temporary General Director, and then officially the General Director of PJSC "Shipbuilding Plant" Severnaya Verf".

The appointment to the post of the head of a shipbuilding enterprise cannot be called unexpected, since Orlov, from the time he began his career at the Zvezdochka enterprise in the city of Severodvinsk, is closely acquainted with the current vice-president of the United Shipbuilding Corporation (United Shipbuilding Corporation), L.V. Strugov. Both started working as electricians at this plant, both then began to engage in economics (Leonid Strugov - in the early nineties - Deputy Director for Economics of the Polyarnaya Zvezda plant, leaving this position in the early 90s and going into business in partnership with the future governor of the region Kiselev N.I.). Being in leading positions in the leadership of the Arkhangelsk region, and then heading it, Orlov naturally contacted LV Strugov on shipbuilding issues, who, before moving to USC, headed the Department of the shipbuilding industry and marine technology of the Ministry of Industry and Trade). The source of personnel appointments both at the local level, both in Severodvinsk and at a higher level until then, were people from the shipbuilding industry (ex-deputy mayor of the city Davidenko ON, who worked next to Orlov at NIPTB Onega, ex-mayor of the city Gmyrin M.A., the ex-head of the tax department of the city of Tyshov S.M., who are also closely related to their previous work with the Zvezdochka enterprise, a member of the board of the Russian military-industrial complex V.Ya. Pospelov, the ex-director of the Arctic enterprise ....  and others).

Family

His wife, Tatyana Pavlovna Orlova, is the head of the Good World charity foundation.

His son, Gleb Orlov (born in 1997) is a football player of FC Northern Dvina, and is the captain of the youth regional football team.

His older daughter, Daria, has two children, Demid and Danil.

Personal life

His hobbies were sports, theater, charity work. Since childhood and still plays football. He participates in friendly matches, plays for the team of the regional government.

References

1964 births
Living people
United Russia politicians
Governors of Arkhangelsk Oblast